King of Spain mainly refers to:
 The monarchy of Spain, headed by the King or Queen of Spain
 Felipe VI, current King of Spain
 The full list of Spanish monarchs

It may also refer to:
 "King of Spain", a song by the Canadian band Moxy Früvous
 "King of Spain", a song by the American indie rock band Galaxie 500
 "King of Spain", a song by Swedish indie folk artist The Tallest Man On Earth
 Future Kings of Spain, an Irish rock band
 Raoul and the Kings of Spain, an album by the English band Tears for Fears
 A nickname for Ashley Giles, an English cricketer